Faith  Ogallo (born 3 February 1994) is a Kenyan taekwondo practitioner. She represented Kenya at the 2020 Summer Olympics held in Tokyo, Japan after qualifying at the African Olympic Qualification Tournament held in Rabat, Morocco.

Career 

She previously competed in basketball but was recommended to switch to taekwondo by her Kibabii University taekwondo coach.

In 2019, she represented Kenya at the African Games held in Rabat, Morocco, and won the silver medal in the women's +73 kg event.

In 2021, she competed in the women's +67 kg event at the 2020 Summer Olympics in Tokyo, Japan.

In November 2021, she participated in the Queen's Baton Relay ahead of the 2022 Commonwealth Games.

Achievements

References

External links 
 

Living people
1994 births
Place of birth missing (living people)
Kenyan female taekwondo practitioners
African Games medalists in taekwondo
African Games silver medalists for Kenya
Competitors at the 2019 African Games
Taekwondo practitioners at the 2020 Summer Olympics
Olympic taekwondo practitioners of Kenya
African Taekwondo Championships medalists
20th-century Kenyan women
21st-century Kenyan women